Andronikos Komnenos or Andronicus Comnenus may refer to:

 Andronikos Komnenos (son of Alexios I) (1091–1130/31), Byzantine prince
 Andronikos Komnenos (son of John II) (-1142), Byzantine prince
 Andronikos I Komnenos (-1185), Byzantine emperor
 Andronikos II Megas Komnenos (d. 1266), ruler of Trebizond
 Andronikos III Megas Komnenos (d. 8 January 1332), ruler of Trebizond